Der Schwur des Soldaten Pooley  is an East German film. It was released in 1963.

External links
 

1963 films
East German films
1960s German-language films
1960s German films